The 2020 Premier Lacrosse League season was the second season for the Premier Lacrosse League (PLL). The season was originally set to begin on May 29 and culminate with a championship game played in late September. Due to the spread of COVID-19, the league postponed the start of their season, and in May announced their season would take place as a championship series between July 25 and August 9, replacing NBCUniversal's coverage of the 2020 Summer Olympics. The Championship Series consisted of playoff seedings based on 4 games of group play taking place at Zions Bank Stadium just outside of Salt Lake City, Utah. The series began with the Whipsnakes Lacrosse Club as the defending league champions and the Waterdogs Lacrosse Club joining the league as an expansion team.

Milestones and events
 February 27 – The league announces Ticketmaster as their Presenting Sponsor and Official Ticketing Partner.
 May 6 – The league announces the regular season will be replaced with a condensed Championship Series due to ongoing COVID-19 concerns. A total of 20 games are set to take place between July 25 and August 9.
 June 11 – The league announces the Championship Series will take place in Herriman, Utah just outside of Salt Lake City. Games will be played inside of Zions Bank Stadium, home of Real Monarchs in the USL Championship.

Coaching changes
Atlas Lacrosse Club – Ben Rubeor was announced the new Atlas head coach after John Paul announced his retirement. Rubeor joins the lacrosse club after serving as an offensive coordinator in the MLL. He played collegiately at the University of Virginia and had a seven-year career at the professional level.
Chrome Lacrosse Club – Tim Soudan was introduced as the new Chrome head coach following legendary coach Dom Starsia's announcement that he would be transitioning to the league advisory board. Soudan arrives with a distinguished professional coaching career, including winning coach of the year in the MLL in 2014. He transitioned into coaching lacrosse after a 14-year career indoor, outdoor, and on the World Lacrosse Championship stage.
Waterdogs Lacrosse Club – Andy Copelan became the Waterdogs Lacrosse Club's first head coach on January 2, 2020. He takes the reigns of an expansion franchise that will build its entire roster through an expansion draft, new player entry draft, and the collegiate draft. Copelan was hired based on his successful NCAA coaching resume. At the helm of Fairfield Stags men's lacrosse, Copelan led the team to the best team record under one head coach and was named MAAC coach of the year in 2015.

Expansion
The addition of a seventh team, the Waterdogs Lacrosse Club, allows for natural bye weeks to occur for each team throughout the season. Paul Rabil first hinted at expansion in a post game interview after the 2019 Championship game. On January 1, 2020, the Premier Lacrosse League announced the Waterdogs identity. An expansion draft took place on February 12 and an entry draft will occur in March to build the new roster with veteran players.

Original Schedule

Championship Series Schedule
Since this season was affected by COVID-19, it was called the PLL Championship Series. The season began on July 25 – August 9.

In their "quest for the crown," seven teams competed in the 14 Group Play games that determined playoff seeding leading into the Elimination Round. The remaining teams that were not eliminated moved onto the Semifinals, and lastly, the PLL Championship. All 20 games were played without fans at Zions Bank Stadium in Herriman, Utah and broadcast four games live on NBC, ten games on NBCSN, and live streamed on NBC Sports Gold.

Championship Series bracket

Standings

Expansion Draft 
The 2020 expansion draft occurred on February 12 for the Waterdogs Lacrosse Club to build their initial roster. The original 6 Lacrosse Clubs submitted a roster of 11 protected players (1 goalie and 10 positional players) to the PLL. These 11 players were not be available for selection by the seventh Lacrosse Club in the Expansion Draft. Any player, with the exception of active military members and rookie holdouts, not protected by their club was entered into the pool for selection by the Waterdogs.

Format:

 A total of 18 players were selected in the expansion draft
 No more than 4 players could be drafted from an existing Lacrosse Club
 Remaining non-protected players were removed from the expansion draft pool and returned to their original club

Player Entry Draft 

The 2020 player entry draft occurred on March 16 for teams to select players arriving from rival Major League Lacrosse. On March 4, Paul Burmeister and NBCSN hosted an entry draft lottery for selection order. Out of 100 balls to select from, Waterdogs had 40, Chrome had 25, Atlas had 15, Archers had 10, Chaos had 6, Redwoods had 3, and the champion Whipsnakes had 1.

Rob Pannell was announced to be transferring to the PLL on March 9, followed by 15 other players the following day, which comprised the selection pool for the entry draft. A total of 14 players were selected in the entry draft with remaining new players entering the league player pool.

College Draft 
The 2020 collegiate draft occurred on May 13 after being reschedule due to COVID-19 concerns. The draft was broadcast on NBCSN and featured a condensed format. With many seniors choosing to return to school on an extra year of eligibility granted by the NCAA and the PLL season being condensed into a prime time tournament, the 2020 draft was conducted through two rounds. All previous draft pick trade rights from the past season were transferred to the 2021 draft.

Format:

 Each club is awarded two picks.
 Eligible players must have completed their senior season.

Championship
The top-ranked, undefeated and PLL defending champs, the Whipsnakes became the repeat champions when they won their second straight championship by winning against the low-seeded, but red-hot Chaos by a score of 12–6.

In the opening first three quarters, great defense by Chaos shutdown the Whipsnakes. 

However, in the fourth quarter Chaos weren't able to stop the Whipsnakes as they went on a 10–0 run fueled by attackman Zed Williams, along with Matt Rambo assists. 

Williams tied the PLL single-game record with 6 goals, scoring 5 in the fourth quarter alone and was named Tournament MVP.

Ratings
This season's PLL Championship Game brought in a Total Audience Delivery (TAD) of 340,000 viewers on NBC, outperforming the 2019 Championship Game (276,000 viewers) by an impressive 23%.

All 14 combined broadcasts on NBC and NBCSN averaged 153,000 Total Viewers, an increase of 33% over the 2019 inaugural PLL season.

Awards

All-Tournament Team 
Attack: Zed Williams (Whipsnakes), Matt Rambo (Whipsnakes), Josh Byrne (Chaos)

Midfield: Tom Schreiber (Archers), Michael Ehrhardt (Whipsnakes), Joe Nardella (Whipsnakes)

Defense: Matt Dunn (Whipsnakes), Jack Rowlett (Chaos), Garrett Epple (Redwoods)

Goalie: Blaze Riorden (Chaos)

Source:

References 

Premier Lacrosse League
Premier Lacrosse League
Lacrosse